FR Velles was a French association football club based in the commune of Velles, Indre. In the 1997–98 season, the club reached the Seventh Round of the Coupe de France, but were defeated 9–0 by Chamois Niortais.

The club was dissolved in 2019 as part of a merger of three local clubs from Velles, Arthon and La Pérouille to form FC Valp 36.

References

External links
FR Velles club information at the FFF

Defunct football clubs in France
2019 disestablishments in France
Sport in Indre
Association football clubs disestablished in 2019
Football clubs in Centre-Val de Loire